The 2008 Washington Republican presidential caucuses were held on Saturday February 9 and the primary on February 19, 2008 to compete 40 total delegates, of which 18 tied to the caucuses, 19 tied to the primary, and 3 unpledged RNC member delegates.

Candidates
All following candidates appeared on the ballot for voters in Washington:

 Mike Huckabee
 John McCain
 Ron Paul
 Mitt Romney (candidate has suspended his campaign)

Caucuses
Voting in Washington's caucuses closed at 9:00 pm EST February 9.

The Washington Republican Party declared John McCain the winner on the night of the election, after 87% of the votes were counted.  Mike Huckabee disputed the results and accused the state party of calling the election prematurely.  He demanded a state-wide caucus  recount.  However, by Tuesday, February 12, the Washington Republicans again declared McCain the winner after 96% of the votes were tallied, and never counted the rest of the votes.

Primary
The primary took place on February 19, 2008.

* Candidate stopped campaign before primary

Money raised
The following table shows the amount of money each Republican Party candidate raised in the state of Washington.

See also
 2008 Republican Party presidential primaries
 2008 Washington Democratic presidential caucuses

References

Washington
2008 Washington (state) elections
2008

es:Asambleas del Partido Republicano de 2008 en Washington